Richmond-Steveston is a provincial electoral district for the Legislative Assembly of British Columbia, Canada.

Demographics

Geography

History 
This riding has elected the following Members of Legislative Assembly:

Election results

Student Vote results 
Student Vote Canada is a non-partisan program in Canada that holds mock elections in elementary and high schools alongside general elections (with the same candidates and same electoral system).

See also 
 Richmond
 Steveston

References

External links 
BC Stats Profile - 2001
Results of 2001 election
2001 Expenditures (pdf)
Results of 1996 election
1996 Expenditures
Results of 1991 election
1991 Expenditures
Website of the Legislative Assembly of British Columbia

British Columbia provincial electoral districts
Politics of Richmond, British Columbia
Provincial electoral districts in Greater Vancouver and the Fraser Valley